Nam Na-yeong (born 1970) is a South Korean film editor and negative cutter. She has edited films with directors Ryoo Seung-wan (Arahan, The City of Violence, and  Crying Fist), Kim Jee-woon (The Good, the Bad, the Weird and I Saw the Devil), and Kang Hyeong-cheol (Scandal Makers, Sunny, and Tazza: The Hidden Card). As of 2020, Nam has edited more than 60 films.

Early life and career
Nam was born in 1970, in Busan, South Korea. She graduated from Kyungsung University's Department of Theater and Film.

Nam began her career as a negative cutter in 1997. Her career as a film editor began with the 2002 film Wet Dreams, and went on to work with established South Korean film directors. She has edited with directors Ryoo Seung-wan (Arahan, The City of Violence, and  Crying Fist), Kim Jee-woon (The Good, the Bad, the Weird and I Saw the Devil), and Kang Hyeong-cheol (Scandal Makers, Sunny, and Tazza: The Hidden Card).

Recognitions
Nam was nominated in the Best Editing category for her works on Arahan, The Good, the Bad, the Weird, Scandal Makers, and Confession of Murder; and won for Crying Fist and Masquerade. She won an Asian Film Award for I Saw the Devil; and at the Blue Dragon Awards, she won for Masquerade and was nominated for Tazza: The Hidden Card.

Filmography

References

External links 
 
 Nam Na-yeong at HanCinema
 남나영 at Naver 영화 (Korean)
 남나영 at Cine 21 (Korean)

1971 births
Living people
Kyungsung University alumni
People from Busan
South Korean film editors
Women film editors